Todd Reynolds is an American violinist, composer, and conductor well known for his work with amplified violin and electronics.

Career 
A student of Jascha Heifetz and former principal of the Rochester Philharmonic Orchestra, Reynolds entered into the contemporary music scene in New York City as a member of Bang on a Can and Steve Reich and Musicians. Reynolds co-founded the string quartet Ethel as an attempt to take a classical ensemble format into the technological age by collaborating with a series of avant-garde and experimental composers, musicians, and artists to expand the string quartet repertoire to include electronic and interactive works.

Reynolds' playing has been critically acclaimed both in his career as a repertoire violinist and as an improviser. He has collaborated and recorded with a wide range of artists, most notably Anthony Braxton, John Cale, Steve Coleman, Yo-Yo Ma, and Todd Rundgren. Reynolds produces and curates a number of events centered on his playing, including Nuove Uova and Still Life With Microphone, both featuring long-term collaborators of Reynolds such as Michael Lowenstern and R. Luke DuBois. Reynolds has been the recipient of a number of grants and awards for his work, including ASCAP awards and a 2003 Meet the Composer Commissioning Award.

He released his debut artist album, the double LP Outerborough, on Innova Recordings in 2011. Featuring one disc of music composed and performed by Reynolds, and a second disc of music composed by the likes of Michael Gordon, Nick Zammuto, David T. Little, Ken Thompson, Paula Matthusen, and David Lang, the album received considerable acclaim, including being named Amazon's best classical release of the year.

Discography

 Outerborough (Innova Recordings, 2011)

With Uri Caine

The Goldberg Variations (Winter & Winter, 2000)

References

External links 
 Home Page
 Todd Reynolds radio interview on Rundgren Radio

American male violinists
Living people
Contemporary classical music performers
Year of birth missing (living people)
Place of birth missing (living people)
21st-century American violinists
21st-century American male musicians
Ethel (string quartet) members